Kadhimiya or Kadhimayn is a northern neighbourhood of the city of Baghdad, Iraq. 'Kadhimiya' is also the name of one of nine administrative districts in Baghdad. As the place of al-Kadhimiya Mosque, even before its inception into the urban area of Baghdad, it is regarded as a holy city by Twelver Shia.

Religious significance and history

 The Kāẓimayn ("Two who swallow their anger"), from whom the Mosque and area of Kadhimiyyah are named, are the Twelver Shia Imams Musa al-Kadhim and his grandson, Muhammad al-Jawad ibn Ali al-Ridha. The qubur (graves) of the Kāẓimayn, and the scholars Mufid and Nasir al-Din al-Tusi, are within the premises of the Mosque. The area that now constitutes Al-Kāẓimiyyah was originally the location of a graveyard reserved for members of the Quraysh. This land was set aside for this purpose by the Abbasid caliph Harun al-Rashid. In its early history, the town was an important center of Shia learning, perhaps the main center, but over time the town declined, and other cities rose to prominence.
 The location of the city has lent it to numerous plunders, that have resulted in damage to its shrines at different times in history. Among the most damage ever experienced by the town was after the Mongol Siege of Baghdad (1258) where the shrine of the Shia Imams was burnt down.
 During the Government of Midhat Pasha in the Ottoman Empire, a tramway was built between Baghdad and Kadhiyma in order to transport  the pilgrims who traveled to the Shia shrines. The tramway was in service until 1938 when bus services began to be established.  
The area was also an important center of Iraqi revolt against the British after World War I.
 Baha'u'llah lived in this section of Baghdad during His exile from Iran, famously dictating the Hidden Words on the banks of the Tigris river
 In 2005, a stampede occurred on Al-Aimmah Bridge over the Tigris River. About 1000 people were killed.
 Iraqi officials executed Saddam Hussein at an American operated facility in al-Kāẓimiyyah known as "Camp Justice".
 Baghdad Security Plan: During Operation Imposing Law in 2007, there were rumours that United States' forces built walls around Al-Kadhimiyya Mosque. According to Iraqslogger.com, the protests that resulted were due to an agreement between Iraqi security officials and the Mahdi Army (now called the Peace Companies) that US forces would not come within  of the shrine.
 Pilgrims to the shrine were attacked on 30 April 2016, leading to wider protests.

Government and infrastructure

Kadhimiyya Women's Prison is in the area. Women on Iraq's death row are held at the Shaaba Khamsa death row facility at Camp Justice. As of 2014 the adult women's death row had 36 women as well as children even though the facility was only intended to hold 25 women.

Education

Amil High School for Girls is in this neighborhood.

See also

 Holiest sites in Shia Islam
 List of neighborhoods and districts in Baghdad
 List of places in Iraq

References

External links
 New York Times article about the district, May 18, 2007

Al-Kadhimayn
Administrative districts in Baghdad
Neighborhoods in Baghdad